The Technical University of Lisbon (UTL;) was a Portuguese public university. It was created in 1930 in Lisbon, as a confederation of preexisting schools, and comprised the faculties and institutes of veterinary medicine; agricultural sciences; economics and business administration; engineering, social and political sciences; architecture; and human kinetics.

On July 25, 2013, it merged with the older University of Lisbon (1911–2013) and was incorporated in the new University of Lisbon.

Faculties
 Veterinary Medicine: FMV - Faculdade de Medicina Veterinária
 Agricultural Sciences: ISA - Instituto Superior de Agronomia
 Economics and Business Management: ISEG - Instituto Superior de Economia e Gestão
 Engineering, Science and Technology: IST - Instituto Superior Técnico
 Social and Political Sciences: ISCSP - Instituto Superior de Ciências Sociais e Políticas
 Human Kinetics: FMH - Faculdade de Motricidade Humana
 Architecture: FA - Faculdade de Arquitectura

The faculties offer all levels of academic degrees in a wide range of fields, ranging from veterinary medicine to agricultural sciences to engineering to political science to sporting management.

Notable alumni
People who have been awarded a degree by the Technical University of Lisbon or otherwise have attended this university, include:
Alberto Romão Dias, Researcher, university professor.
Álvaro Siza Vieira, Architect, university professor, Pritzker Prize winner 1992.
António Borges (economist), Vice President of Goldman Sachs International
Amílcar Cabral, Bissau-Guinean independence fighter, guerrilla, agronomist.
António Câmara, Entrepreneur, university professor, civil engineer.
Aníbal Cavaco Silva, former President of Republic and Prime Minister, university professor, economist.
António Guterres, former Prime Minister, politician, electrical engineer.
Arlindo Oliveira, Scientist, electrical engineer.
Bagão Félix, Minister, politician, economist.
Bento de Jesus Caraça, Antifascist resistance, mathematician and economist.
Carla Gomes, computer scientist, computational sustainability researcher, university professor.
Carlos Carvalhas, Communist leader, politician, economist.
Carlos Queiroz, football manager, physical educator.
Dom Duarte Pio de Bragança, 24th Duke of Braganza, claimant to the throne of Portugal, agronomist.
Eduardo Ferro Rodrigues, Socialist leader, politician, economist.
Fernando Ulrich, Banker, banking administrator (did not graduate).
Francisco Louçã, Left Bloc leader, politician, university professor, economist.
Jaime Nogueira Pinto, writer and university professor.
Jesualdo Ferreira, football manager, physical educator.
José Mourinho, football manager, physical educator.
Manuel Pinho, politician and economist
Manuela Ferreira Leite Former leader PSD, minister, politician, economist.
Maria de Lurdes Pintasilgo, Prime Minister, politician, chemical engineer.
Mariano Gago, minister, politician, university professor, scientist, electrical engineer.
Nelo Vingada, football manager, physical educator.
Nuno Crato, university professor, researcher, writer, mathematician and economist.
Ricardo Espírito Santo, banker and art collector.
Susana Feitor, racewalker.
Tim, musician, vocalist of Xutos & Pontapés, agronomist.
Vítor Constâncio, former governor Banco de Portugal, politician, economist.

See also
List of higher education institutions in Portugal
Higher education in Portugal

Notes and references

External links
Universidade Técnica de Lisboa

 
Educational institutions established in 1930
1930 establishments in Portugal